Champagnac-le-Vieux is a commune in the Haute-Loire department and Auvergne-Rhône-Alpes region of south-east central France.

Population

See also
Communes of the Haute-Loire department

References

Communes of Haute-Loire